William Thomas Callaghan (born 12 February 1943 in Cowdenbeath) is a Scottish former professional footballer, who played for Dunfermline Athletic, Berwick Rangers, Cowdenbeath and Scotland. Callaghan played for Dunfermline for most of his club career, playing in two Scottish Cup Finals, losing 3–2 to Celtic in 1965 and winning 3–1 against Hearts in 1968. In all he made 426 appearances for the Pars, including 34 in European competition, a club record. Willie's brother Tommy Callaghan also played for Dunfermline, and they are the last pair of brothers to have played the full 90 minutes together in the same Scottish Cup-winning side as of 2009,-   In 2008, Callaghan was inducted into Dunfermline Athletic's hall of fame.

Callaghan represented the full Scotland national team six times between 1967 and 1970. He first played for Scotland during an overseas tour in 1967, when several players were unavailable due to their clubs being involved in European competition. The Scottish Football Association decided in October 2021 to reclassify some of these games as full internationals, which increased his cap tally from two to six. Callaghan's appearance against Wales in 1970 was the last time that a Dunfermline Athletic player represented Scotland until Barry Nicholson and Stevie Crawford were selected for a match against Poland in 2001.

Willie's son, also named Willie, was a footballer who played for several league clubs in the 1980s and 1990s. His brother, Tommy Callaghan, played for Dunfermline and Celtic. His grandson, Liam Callaghan, had a trial spell with Birmingham City in November 2011.

References

Sources

1943 births
Living people
Association football fullbacks
Scottish footballers
Scotland international footballers
Dunfermline Athletic F.C. players
Berwick Rangers F.C. players
Cowdenbeath F.C. players
Scottish Football League players
Scottish Football League representative players
People from Cowdenbeath
Footballers from Fife